Barry Hills (born 2 April 1937) is a retired British thoroughbred horse trainer. He lives in Lambourn, England.

Biography

Barry Hills had three sons in his first marriage, to Maureen Newson: John, Michael, and Richard. John (died 2014) was a horse trainer, while the twins Michael and Richard are retired jockeys both of whom are still active in the horse racing industry, After his divorce, he married Penny Hills, and had two more sons, Charles and George. Charles is a current trainer and George provides bloodstock insurance in Lexington, Kentucky, United States.

Career

In the mid-1950s, Barry Hills was an apprentice jockey to, among others, Fred Rimell. In 1959, he was the head lad of John Oxley. In 1969, he acquired a horse training license and began training horses at South Bank Stables in Lambourn.

In 1986, he moved to Robert Sangster's Manton Yard where he remained until 1990, when he moved back to South Bank. By the end of 2000, he had trained 2166 winning horses in Britain. He trained his 3,000th winner, when Chapter And Verse won at Pontefract on 7 April 2009.

In 2009, he was presented with two Lifetime Achievement Awards at the Animal Health Trust Equine Awards and at the Derby Awards, both in London. He ended his training career on 22 August 2011. His son, Charles Hills, took over the licence.

When another son, John, died of cancer in 2014, Barry Hills was given a temporary licence to take over the running of the Kingwood House stable in Lambourn.

Major wins

 Great Britain
 1,000 Guineas – (2) – Enstone Spark (1978), Ghanaati (2009)
 2,000 Guineas – (2) – Tap On Wood (1979), Haafhd (2004)
 Ascot Gold Cup – (2) – Gildoran (1984, 1985)
 Benson and Hedges Gold Cup – (2) – Hawaiian Sound (1978), Cormorant Wood (1984)
 Champion Stakes – (3) – Cormorant Wood (1983), Storming Home (2002), Haafhd (2004)
 Cheveley Park Stakes – (1) – Desirable (1983)
 Cork and Orrery Stakes – (1) – Royal Applause (1997)
 Coronation Stakes – (2) – Maids Causeway (2005), Ghanaati (2009)
 Dewhurst Stakes – (3) – Scenic (1988, dead-heat), In Command (1996), Distant Music (1999)
 Fillies' Mile – (1) – Silk Slippers (1989)
 Haydock Sprint Cup – (2) – Royal Applause (1997), Red Clubs (2007)
 King's Stand Stakes – (1) – Equiano (2010)
 Lockinge Stakes – (1) – Cormorant Wood (1984, dead-heat)
 Middle Park Stakes – (3) – Gallic League (1987), Royal Applause (1995), Dark Angel (2007)
 Nunthorpe Stakes – (2) – Handsome Sailor (1988), La Cucaracha (2005)
 Prince of Wales's Stakes – (1) – Kind of Hush (1982)
 Queen Elizabeth II Stakes – (1) – Sure Blade (1986)
 St. James's Palace Stakes – (1) – Sure Blade (1986)
 St Leger – (1) – Moonax (1994) 
 Stayers' Hurdle – (1) – Nomadic Way (1992)
 Sun Chariot Stakes – (2) – Cormorant Wood (1983), Spinning Queen (2006)
 Sussex Stakes – (1) – Distant Relative (1990)
 Yorkshire Oaks – (1) – Dibidale (1974)

 Austria 
 Austrian Derby – (1) – Zimzalabim (1993)

 France
 Grand Prix de Saint-Cloud – (2) – Rheingold (1972, 1973)
 Prix de l'Abbaye de Longchamp – (1) – Handsome Sailor (1988)
 Prix de l'Arc de Triomphe – (1) – Rheingold (1973)
 Prix Ganay – (1) – Rheingold (1973)
 Prix Jean Prat – (1) – Golden Snake (1999)
 Prix du Moulin de Longchamp – (1) – Distant Relative (1990)
 Prix Royal-Oak – (1) – Moonax (1994)
 Prix de la Salamandre – (1) – Our Mirage (1971)

 Ireland
 Irish 1,000 Guineas – (2) – Nicer (1993), Hula Angel (1999)
 Irish Derby – (1) – Sir Harry Lewis (1987)
 Irish Oaks – (2) – Dibidale (1974), Bolas (1994)
 Matron Stakes – (1) – Pixie Erin (1987)
 National Stakes – (1) – Tap On Wood (1978)
 Pretty Polly Stakes – (1) – Lady Upstage (2000)

 Italy 
 Oaks d'Italia – (1) – Atoll (1990)
 Premio Regina Elena – (1) – Atoll (1990)

 Slovakia
 Slovakian Derby – (1) – Zimzalabim (1993)

References

External links
Barry's NTRA Webpage
Barry's Website

1937 births
British racehorse trainers
Living people
People from Lambourn